Hayden Brian Phillips (born 6 February 1998) is a New Zealand field hockey player who plays as a midfielder for English club Holcombe.

Early life
Phillips was born in Palmerston North in 1998.

Playing career
Phillips played in the 2014 Summer Youth Olympics. He then made his senior debut in March 2016 and went on to represent New Zealand in the 2016 Sultan Azlan Shah Cup and 2016 Summer Olympics.
Phillips moved to England in January 2020 to play for Holcombe alongside Barry Middleton.
After taking a break from international hockey, Phillips returned to the Blacksticks Squad in 2022 playing against Australia in the Trans Tasman Series.

References

External links
 
 
 

1998 births
Living people
Sportspeople from Palmerston North
Olympic field hockey players of New Zealand
New Zealand male field hockey players
Male field hockey midfielders
Field hockey players at the 2016 Summer Olympics
Field hockey players at the 2014 Summer Youth Olympics
Field hockey players at the 2018 Commonwealth Games
Field hockey players at the 2022 Commonwealth Games
2018 Men's Hockey World Cup players
Commonwealth Games silver medallists for New Zealand
Commonwealth Games medallists in field hockey
Holcombe Hockey Club players
Men's England Hockey League players
2023 Men's FIH Hockey World Cup players
20th-century New Zealand people
21st-century New Zealand people
Medallists at the 2018 Commonwealth Games